QuickSmart is a basic academic skills program aimed at middle years students in Australia. Two programs using the same approach encourage fast and accurate basic skills in literacy or numeracy.

History
The QuickSmart Numeracy and Literacy programs were developed by John Pegg and Lorraine Graham of the National Centre of Science, Information and Communication Technology and Mathematics Education for Rural and Regional Australia (SiMERR) at the University of New England, Armidale, New South Wales, Australia. These programs began implementation in schools in 2001. In May 2009, the NSW Department of Education and Training announced that QuickSmart Numeracy was an approved numeracy intervention program to be offered under the new state/federal school partnership funding arrangement for schools with literacy and numeracy needs and schools in areas of low socioeconomic status. In 2013 the South Australian State Government funded QuickSmart training for Department of Education schools, who met certain eligibility criteria. Since then over 400 SA Department of Education Schools have implemented QuickSmart. By 2018, both QuickSmart Numeracy and Literacy Programs have been implemented in over 1400 primary and high school around Australia. In 2018 approximately 800 schools involving approximately 5,000 students were using QuickSmart.

Aims
QuickSmart aims to reverse the trend of ongoing poor academic performance for students who have been struggling at school and who are caught in a cycle of continued failure. It also includes a professional learning program that provides the opportunity for classroom teachers, special needs support teachers, and teacher aides to discuss and practise ways to significantly improve under-achieving middle school students' learning outcomes in basic mathematics and literacy.

QuickSmart instructors work in small class instructional settings with two students, for three 30 minute lessons a week, over thirty weeks. They use a specially constructed teaching program supported by extensive material and computer-based resources. The program is called QuickSmart to encourage students to become quick in their response speed and smart in their understanding and strategy use. In QuickSmart, the aim is to improve students’ information retrieval times to levels that free working memory capacity from an excessive focus on mundane or routine tasks. In these interventions, automaticity is fostered; time, accuracy and understanding are incorporated as key dimensions of learning, and an emphasis is placed on ensuring maximum student on-task time. The lessons help develop the learners’ abilities to monitor their own learning and to set realistic goals for themselves.<ref>Pegg, J. & Graham, L. 2007, 'Addressing The Needs Of Low-Achieving Mathematics Students: Helping Students 'Trust Their Heads, Keynote. In K. Milton, H. Reeves, & T. Spencer (Eds.) Proceedings of the 21st biennial conference of the Australian Association of Mathematics Teachers. </ref>

Results

Independent (statewide or standardised tests) assessment results gathered from QuickSmart and comparison students since 2001 have consistently demonstrated student growth of two to four years’ improvement over a 30-week period as measured by effect size statistics. Interviews and surveys of students, parents, teachers, and principals have gathered consistently positive qualitative data, indicating improvements for QuickSmart'' students in class, in their attitudes to school, their attendance rates and their levels of confidence in and out of the classroom.

References

External links
 http://www.une.edu.au/simerr/quicksmart/pages/index.php

Education in Australia